The Australia women's national cricket team toured New Zealand in February 1997. They played against New Zealand in three One Day Internationals, which were competed for the Rose Bowl. New Zealand won the series 2–1.

Squads

Tour Match

50-over match: Central Districts and Wellington v Australia

WODI Series

1st ODI

2nd ODI

3rd ODI

References

External links
Australia Women tour of New Zealand 1998/99 from Cricinfo

Women's international cricket tours of New Zealand
1999 in New Zealand cricket
Australia women's national cricket team tours